Luciano Taccone (born 29 May 1989) is an Argentine triathlete. He competed in the men's event at the 2016 Summer Olympics.

References

External links
 

1989 births
Living people
Argentine male triathletes
Olympic triathletes of Argentina
Triathletes at the 2016 Summer Olympics
Place of birth missing (living people)
Triathletes at the 2015 Pan American Games
Triathletes at the 2019 Pan American Games
South American Games silver medalists for Argentina
South American Games medalists in triathlon
Competitors at the 2014 South American Games
Pan American Games medalists in triathlon
Pan American Games bronze medalists for Argentina
Medalists at the 2019 Pan American Games
20th-century Argentine people
21st-century Argentine people